Jérôme Galloni d'Istria (20 January 1815 in Olmeto – 14 April 1890) was a French Bonapartist politician. He was a member of the National Assembly from 1871 to 1876, sitting with the Appel au peuple parliamentary group, and a Senator from 1876 to 1885.

References

1815 births
1890 deaths
People from Corse-du-Sud
Corsican politicians
Appel au peuple
Members of the National Assembly (1871)
French Senators of the Third Republic
Senators of Corsica